Psoralea pinnata is an erect evergreen shrub or small tree that grows to a height between  and  tall.

Description 
This plant blooms with white, lilac or blue pea shaped sweet smelling flowers between October and December. in large clusters toward the end of the branches. 
Flowering is followed by the production of small pods, each of these contain a single dark brown seed.

Distribution 
Psoralea pinnata is a native of South Africa; it is also an established alien species in other countries, particularly Southern Australia and New Zealand.

Common names 
Psoralea pinnata has many common names. In South Africa the plant is commonly known as the fountain bush or fonteinbos, it also is called penwortel, bloukeur and is known as umhlonishwa by the Zulu. In Australia, where P. pinnata is a weed, it is known as taylorina and in Western Australia it is also known as the blue broom or the Albany broom.  In other parts of the world it is also called the African scurf pea, taylorina, blue psoralea and the Dally pine.

References

Psoraleeae
Trees of South Africa
Plants described in 1753
Taxa named by Carl Linnaeus